KOCB (channel 34) is a television station in Oklahoma City, Oklahoma, United States, affiliated with The CW. It is owned by Sinclair Broadcast Group alongside Fox affiliate KOKH-TV (channel 25). The stations' studios and transmitter facilities are co-located on East Wilshire Boulevard and 78th Street on the city's northeast side.

History

As an independent station
The UHF channel 34 allocation in Oklahoma City was contested between two groups that competed for the Federal Communications Commission (FCC)'s approval of a construction permit to build and license to operate a new television station. Rockford, Illinois–based General Media Corporation filed the initial application on January 24, 1977. Later, on April 12, Oklahoma City Broadcasting, Inc.—majority owned by veteran television station manager and production director Ted F. Baze (who served as station manager at WPHL-TV in Philadelphia at the time of the filing, and, as channel 34's original vice president and general manager, appeared in some on-air promotions), and co-founded with Oklahoma City-based businessman James H. Milligan and local real estate broker Ina Lou Marquis—filed a separate application. The FCC granted the permit to General Media (which would own the station through a direct subsidiary, Seraphim Media Corp.) on March 2, 1979, shortly after Seraphim reached an agreement with Oklahoma City Broadcasting that gave the latter a 20% ownership stake in the station in exchange for the Baze-led group dismissing its license application. Shortly after obtaining approval for the permit and license, the General Media/Baze consortium chose to request KGMC (which was chosen as a reference to Seraphim's corporate parent) as the television station's call letters.

The station first signed on the air at 7:00 a.m. on October 28, 1979; KGMC's first broadcast was a half-hour religious program hosted by evangelists Tony and Susan Alamo, which aired as part of the station's initial schedule. It was the fifth commercial television station and second UHF station to sign on in the Oklahoma City market, as well as the second independent station to launch in the market (and in Oklahoma, more broadly). Because Blair Broadcasting had converted educational independent KOKH-TV (channel 25, now a Fox affiliate) to a commercial entertainment format four weeks earlier on October 1, KGMC narrowly missed being the first commercial station to have signed on in the market since ABC affiliate KOCO-TV (channel 5) debuted 25 years earlier (as Enid-based KGEO-TV) on July 2, 1954. (KGMC would gain another independent competitor when the Gene Autry-controlled Golden West Broadcasters signed on KAUT [channel 43] on October 15, 1980, a station which initially launched with programming from subscription television service Video Entertainment Unlimited [VEU] seven nights a week and on weekend afternoons; three weeks later on November 3, KAUT expanded its schedule to include an afternoon rolling news block and a limited amount of syndicated entertainment programs on weekdays during the daytime hours.) Originally broadcasting daily from 6:30 a.m. until 1:00 a.m., KGMC-TV initially maintained a programming format consisting of a mix of cartoons, classic sitcoms, westerns and drama series, religious programs and some older movies. Baze elected to based its programming acquisitions around the success of the chosen syndicated programs in other markets with independent stations. The station's feature film schedule—which initially consisted of two presentations per day Sunday through Friday and up to five each Saturday, with commercial breaks during its prime time presentations (airing at 8:00 p.m. Monday through Saturdays at the time) limited to nine minutes of advertising per film—also periodically included themed weeks of films centering around specific movie genres or classic film actors.

On December 7, 1982, Oklahoma City Broadcasting purchased 80% of Seraphim Media for $5.2 million in stock, in exchange for increasing the Baze-led group's interest in KGMC to 85%; the transaction received FCC approval on February 16, 1983, and was finalized on April 20. Then, in August 1983, Baze sold 85% of Oklahoma City Broadcasting to the Beverly Hills Hotel Corp. (owned by New York City financier Ivan Boesky) for $7 million. The transfer was approved by the FCC on October 21, and was finalized on December 9. On September 3, 1986, three months before he was sentenced to a three-year prison term on stock fraud and insider trading charges, Boesky transferred direct control of KGMC-TV to his wife, Seema Boesky. Investigations launched by the FCC and the Securities and Exchange Commission into the transfer and other potential improprieties concerning the Boeskys' ownership of KGMC revealed that the transfer was not disclosed until mid-December, that the Boeskys did not seek FCC approval of the transfer before its consummation, and that they had effective control of the license through a voting trust created two years before Ivan purchased the station that was never disclosed to the FCC. Seema—who blamed the issue on "too many layers of lawyers" being involved in the family's business interests—in requesting that the FCC withhold considering revocation of the license, proposed selling KGMC to a minority-owned group per the FCC's "distress sale" policy (which allowed stations at risk of losing their license to be purchased by a qualified minority buyer at a discount) in proposals seeking to dissolve Beverly Hills Hotel Corp.

Financial troubles and stability
Despite just barely ranking as a top-40 Nielsen market at the time, the Oklahoma City market did not have enough television-viewing households to support what were essentially three independent stations, nor was there a supply of programming on the syndication market that could sufficiently fill their respective schedules. By the late 1980s, channel 34 was suffering financially, having rarely turned a profit, and incurring debt on programming and operational expenses. In the summer of 1988, Visalia, California-based Pappas Telecasting Companies proposed a deal with Busse Broadcast Holdings (a trust company created independently of Gillett Holdings in the name of broadcasting executive George N. Gillett Jr.'s children) to purchase KOKH. KOCB's financial situation led it to get involved in the complex $30-million asset transfer proposal, in which Pappas would have acquired the programming inventories of both KGMC and KAUT (including channel 43's Fox affiliation rights) and integrate many of their acquired programs onto channel 25's schedule, solidifying KOKH's status as the market's dominant independent. Simultaneously, Seraphim Media would donate the license and certain intellectual assets of KGMC to the Oklahoma Educational Television Authority (OETA)—with the intent of converting it into a PBS member station—for $1 million, with Pappas acquiring equipment and property assets owned by the station for an additional $1 million. Heritage Media (through its Rollins Communications subsidiary) would sell KAUT to a religious broadcaster in turn, which would convert that station to a non-commercial religious format.

Governor Henry Bellmon voiced concerns with OETA's involvement in the transaction, suggesting that the purchase of a second Oklahoma City station would result in the authority, which had reported to the legislature that it had limited appropriations to adequately operate its existing state network as it stood, constantly requesting additional state funding. On August 17, 1988, OETA submitted an FCC application to purchase KGMC, after—in advance of a fundraising deadline set for that date—Pappas offered to provide a $1 million contribution toward purchasing the station, contingent upon the company completing the KOKH purchase. OETA would restructure the plan after its board of directors voted against the KGMC proposal the following month. On November 1, 1988,  Cleveland, Ohio-based Maddox Broadcasting Corp. (an African American-owned group run by media executive Chesley Maddox) announced it would buy KGMC from General Media for $3.6 million, including certain intellectual assets that Pappas Telecasting would not acquire under the asset proposal (consisting of transmitter facilities, studio equipment and licenses) worth $2.6 million. Concurrently, Heritage Media announced it would sell KAUT to the OETA for $1 million (along with assets worth $7.75 million and a non-compete agreement worth $500.000). Pappas would also lease the KAUT transmitter facility to OETA for 25 years for an annual operating fee of $1, and contribute an additional $1 million should the acquisition have been completed.

Per the plan, KGMC, under Maddox ownership, planned to carry between 15 and 18 hours of Home Shopping Network (HSN) programming (which, via its Home Shopping Spree broadcast service, was already airing as overnight filler programming on the station) and six hours of religious programs per day, along with some children's and barter-syndicated entertainment programs. Although OETA planned to fund the conversion of channel 43 partly through start-up grants (including a $75,000 award by KOCO-TV management), in a move that hamstrung its attempt to acquire KAUT, the Oklahoma Legislature incorporated stipulations into the bill appropriating OETA's funding for FY1990 that prohibited the use of state funds "for any operational or capital expense of the proposed second educational television channel in Oklahoma City" and from proposing any additional funding to finance the acquisition if it did not obtain sufficient funding from private sources. In late January 1989, Busse management denied Pappas's request to extend the completion deadline for the purchase past its scheduled January 31 deadline. The entire transaction fell through on February 3, when Busse formally terminated the purchase agreement with Pappas. Just three days earlier, the FCC had also dismissed the respective transfer applications for KGMC and KAUT. All three stations continued competing as entertainment-based independents until August 1991, when Heritage initiated a downscaled version of the aborted Pappas proposal, taking over the operations of KOKH and moving the Fox affiliation rights and many syndicated programs carried by KAUT—which Heritage donated to OETA, in turn resulting in its conversion into a PBS station—to channel 25.

Whereas KOKH remained relatively profitable and KAUT had been experiencing a modest uptick in its ratings under its Fox affiliation, KGMC struggled mightily. On February 9, 1989, amid unsustainable debt totaling $9.168 million, Oklahoma City Broadcasting filed for Chapter 11 bankruptcy protection. Separately, Baze sought to acquire control of the station's license and the controlling stock interest held by Boesky; the FCC granted approval of the transfer on January 5, 1990. In March 1991, the U.S. Bankruptcy Court for the Western District of Oklahoma approved Oklahoma City Broadcasting's reorganization plan, in which the company would pay most of its creditors in full with interest within 21 months of its signing. On September 24, 1990, the station's call letters were changed to KOCB, in reference to parent licensee Oklahoma City Broadcasting; the base "OCB" letters were alternatively used for the station's promotional slogan, "Oklahoma City's Best," which it used from that point until January 1998. (The KGMC call letters are now used by an Estrella TV-affiliated television station in Fresno, California.) During this time, KOCB adopted a very sophisticated on-air look for an independent station in a mid-sized market, using CGI graphics of near network-quality.

On January 24, 1993, the station became a charter affiliate of the Prime Time Entertainment Network (PTEN), a syndication service operated as a joint venture between Time Warner and Chris-Craft/United Television. For most intents and purposes, however, KOCB formally remained an independent station, as PTEN never expanded its drama-centric programming schedule beyond its regular Wednesday night lineup. On September 18, 1993, Oklahoma City Broadcasting sold KOCB to Pittsburgh-based Superior Communications, Inc. (owned by broadcasting executives Albert M. Holtz and eventual Nexstar Media Group founder Perry A. Sook, the latter of whom also served as KOCB's president and general manager during Superior's stewardship of the station) for $11 million. The sale to Superior received FCC approval on October 15 of that year.

Network affiliation

As a UPN affiliate
On October 22, 1994, Paramount Television and Chris-Craft/United Television announced that they had reached an agreement with Superior for KOCB to serve as the Oklahoma City charter affiliate of the United Paramount Network (UPN). Once it affiliated with the fledgling Paramount/Chris-Craft-owned network at its launch on January 16, 1995, KOCB—which retained the "TV-34" branding it implemented the year prior, at which time the station adopted a logo and graphics package originally created for then-independent KTVT (now a CBS owned-and-operated station) in Dallas–Fort Worth in 1993—continued to fill the 7:00 to 9:00 p.m. time slot with feature films and some first-run syndicated programs. (UPN offered prime time programs only on Monday and Tuesday nights at launch, before expanding to additional nights between September 1996 and September 1998, when it began programming a five-night-a-week schedule through the extension of its offerings to Thursday and Friday nights.)

Alongside UPN prime time programming and a blend of cartoons and a few live-action children's shows acquired via the syndication market and The Disney Afternoon syndication block (which had moved to channel 34 from KOKH the year prior), KOCB initially carried some recent off-network sitcoms and drama series, movies in late-night and on weekends (including the UPN Movie Trailer, a supplemental weekend film package that premiered in September 1995, and was eventually replaced by a same-week repeat block of drama and reality series aired by the network), and some first-run syndicated shows. PTEN programming continued to air on Wednesdays until UPN expanded its programming to that night in September 1995, when KOCB shifted the service's schedule to Saturday nights (where it would remain until PTEN ceased operations in September 1997) to accommodate UPN's plans to expand its prime time schedule to additional weeknights over the latter half of the 1990s. The station's children's programming inventory expanded in September 1995, when UPN launched a competitor to Fox Kids, UPN Kids (which began with a Sunday morning block, before expanding to include a weekday morning block in September 1997).

On March 4, 1996, the Hunt Valley, Maryland-based Sinclair Broadcast Group acquired KOCB and Fox affiliate WDKY-TV in Lexington, Kentucky from Superior Communications for $63.5 million; the cash and stock transaction was approved by the FCC on April 26, and was finalized two weeks later on May 8.

As a WB affiliate
On July 14, 1997, Sinclair and Time Warner announced the signing of a ten-year, $84-million agreement to switch the affiliations of KOCB and five other stations that Sinclair either owned directly or operated through local marketing agreements with Glencairn, Ltd. (now Cunningham Broadcasting)—UPN affiliates WPTT-TV (now MyNetworkTV affiliate WPNT) in Pittsburgh, WNUV (now a CW affiliate) in Baltimore, WSTR-TV (now a MyNetworkTV affiliate) in Cincinnati, KRRT (now CW affiliate KMYS) in San Antonio and independent station WBSC-TV (now MyNetworkTV affiliate WMYA-TV) in Greenville, South Carolina—to The WB, in exchange for extending existing contracts for its WB affiliates in Milwaukee (WVTV) and Birmingham (WTTO). UPN attempted to block Sinclair's affiliation pact with The WB through lawsuits that co-parent Paramount/Viacom filed in the Baltimore City Circuit Court (near Sinclair's suburban Hunt Valley headquarters) and the Los Angeles County Superior Court, on grounds that Sinclair had struck the deal without notifying UPN in writing that it would terminate the affiliations on the affected stations. A summary judgment issued by the Baltimore circuit court in favor of Sinclair on December 8, 1997, allowed the stations to begin switching to The WB starting on January 15, 1998.

The planned WB switch elicited complaints from Star Trek fans who would lose the ability to watch Star Trek: Voyager as UPN had yet to line up another station to replace KOCB as its Oklahoma City affiliate. Many area residents that did not have either an outdoor antenna to attempt to receive UPN affiliates from Tulsa (KTFO-TV [now MyNetworkTV affiliate KMYT-TV]) or Sulphur (KOKT-LP, now defunct) or a satellite subscription to either Dish Network or PrimeStar (both of which carried New York City owned-and-operated station WWOR-TV [now MyNetworkTV owned-and-operated station] as a default UPN feed) had to resort to acquiring episodes of Voyager—as well as other UPN shows—through tape trading during the second half of the 1997–98 season. On January 8, 1998, two weeks before KOCB switched to The WB, Viacom's Paramount Stations Group subsidiary reached an agreement to purchase KTLC from the Oklahoma Educational Television Authority—which planned to use the proceeds from the sale, which was made possible because OETA maintained the commercial classification of the channel 43 broadcast license after the Heritage Media donation, to fund the construction and sign-on of the digital broadcast transmitters of KETA-TV and its repeaters before an FCC-mandated deadline in December 2003—for $23.5 million.

Channel 34—which, accordingly, adopted "WB34" as its branding—became the market's WB affiliate on January 18, 1998, allowing area viewers who did not have a cable or satellite subscription to watch that network's programs for the first time. (Dating to the network's January 1995 launch, The WB had been available locally on Cox Communications, Multimedia Cablevision, and other local cable and satellite providers through the superstation feed of Chicago affiliate WGN-TV [later conventional basic cable channel WGN America, now NewsNation].) UPN programming would not return to the Oklahoma City market until June 15, when Paramount converted channel 43 into UPN owned-and-operated station KPSG (which would later revert to its original KAUT-TV call letters on December 12). Channel 43 was originally scheduled to join UPN on June 1, but its switch back to a general entertainment format was postponed until June 13, and then to June 15 because of technical difficulties and delays in finalizing the Paramount sale (the issues leading to the second postponement were unrelated to a tornado outbreak that hit central Oklahoma on the evening of the 13th).

On February 4, 1998, three days after Sullivan Broadcast Holdings finalized its purchase of KOKH, a deal necessitated by Sinclair's existing ownership of KOCB, Sinclair exercised an option to purchase channel 25 from Sullivan for $60 million. (Sinclair would later purchase Sullivan's 13 other television stations for $100 million in cash and debt on February 24; this separate transaction was finalized on July 1.) Under the terms of the deal, Sinclair entered into a time brokerage agreement (TBA) with Sullivan—which the company retained as a separate entity to operate KOKH and three other Sullivan-owned Fox affiliates, WTAT-TV in Charleston, South Carolina, WVAH-TV in Charleston, West Virginia and WRGT-TV in Dayton, Ohio—to assume operational responsibilities for KOKH. This arrangement placed KOCB, affiliated with lower-rated The WB, in the unusual position of being the senior partner in a virtual duopoly with a Big Four network affiliate. (A Big Four affiliate normally serves as the senior partner in most virtual or legal duopolies involving an affiliate of a mid-major or smaller network.)

In March 1998, under a sale option exercised by the latter group, Sinclair announced its intent to sell KOKH and the rights to the TBA involving KOCB to Glencairn, Ltd. The family of Sinclair founder Julian Sinclair Smith—led by his widow, Carolyn Smith, who would assume full control of Glencairn from founder and original president Edwin Edwards, a former Sinclair executive, two years later—owned 97% of Glencairn's stock, which would have effectively made the KOKH/KOCB operation a duopoly in violation of FCC rules of the time. Glencairn—which was to be paid with Sinclair stock for the purchases—owned eleven television stations throughout the United States that Sinclair operated under local marketing agreements, and subsequently announced plans to sell five of its stations to Sinclair outright. This prompted Rainbow/PUSH, a civil rights organization headed by Jesse Jackson, to file petitions asking the FCC to deny approval of the transaction, citing concerns over a single company holding two broadcast licenses in one market and arguing that Glencairn passed itself off as a minority-owned company—Edwards, who was also principal owner of Glencairn, is African American—while acting as an arm of Sinclair, and used the LMA to gain control of the station.

On November 17, 1999, Sinclair restructured the deal to acquire KOKH from Sullivan Broadcasting directly as part of a $53.2 million cash and debt forgiveness acquisition involving four other stations—Mission Broadcasting-owned UPN affiliates WUXP-TV (now a MyNetworkTV affiliate) in Nashville and WUPN-TV (now MyNetworkTV affiliate WMYV) in Greensboro, North Carolina, and Montecito Broadcast Group-owned independent station KFBT (now CW affiliate KVCW) in Las Vegas—along with acquiring five Glencairn stations—WB affiliates KRRT (now CW affiliate KMYS) in San Antonio and WVTV (now a CW affiliate) in Milwaukee, and UPN affiliates WBSC-TV (now MyNetworkTV affiliate WMYA-TV) in Anderson, South Carolina, WRDC (now a MyNetworkTV affiliate) in Raleigh–Durham and WABM (now a MyNetworkTV affiliate) in Birmingham—in an all-stock purchase worth $8 million. The Glencairn transaction was dismissed by the FCC per Sinclair's request on July 23, 2001; the sale of the Sullivan stations to Sinclair was approved by FCC on December 10 and was finalized on December 14, resulting in KOKH and KOCB becoming the Oklahoma City market's first legal television duopoly. Although it voted to approve the Sullivan purchase, the FCC issued a $40,000 fine against Sinclair on grounds it controlled Glencairn in violation of the agency's local ownership rules. However, as noted in a 2003 ruling on the matter by the United States Court of Appeals for the District of Columbia Circuit, the issue involving KOKH was rendered somewhat moot, as on August 5, 1999, the FCC began allowing broadcasters the ability to form duopolies between television stations, provided that eight independent owners remain in a market once a duopoly is formed and one of the properties does not rank among the market's four highest-rated stations. However, as noted in a 2003 ruling on the matter by the United States Court of Appeals for the District of Columbia Circuit, the issue involving KOKH was rendered somewhat moot, as on August 5, 1999, the FCC began allowing broadcasters the ability to form duopolies between television stations, provided that eight independent owners remain once a duopoly is formed and only one of the stations ranks among the four highest-rated in the market. In September 2002, KOCB changed its branding to "The WB Oklahoma City," de-emphasizing its UHF channel 34 allocation in part because many central Oklahoma residents viewed the station primarily on cable or satellite. (Most area cable providers—including Cox Communications, which moved the station to that slot in October 1995 in a slot swap with USA Network (which moved to the station's former slot on Cox channel 34)—carry KOCB on channel 11.)

As a CW affiliate
On January 24, 2006, WB network parent Time Warner (through its Warner Bros. Entertainment division) and UPN parent company CBS Corporation announced that they would dissolve the two networks to create The CW, a joint venture between the two media companies that initially featured programs from its two predecessor networks as well as original first-run series produced for the new network. On May 2, 2006, in a joint announcement by the network and Sinclair, KOCB was confirmed as The CW's Oklahoma City charter affiliate. Since the network chose its charter stations based on which of them among The WB and UPN's respective affiliate bodies was the highest-rated in each market, KOCB was chosen to join The CW over KAUT-TV as it had been the higher-rated of the two stations at the time of the agreement's signing (the station had ranked as The WB's most-watched station overall during the 2004–05 season).

Incidentally, KAUT was erroneously mentioned as one of several former soon-to-be-former UPN affiliates owned by CBS Television Stations that would join The CW at its launch, a statement that was later retracted on account of Viacom having sold channel 43 to The New York Times Company on September 14, 2005, four months prior to the CW launch announcement. KAUT's status was left undetermined until August 22, when an email sent by station management confirmed that KAUT would become the market's affiliate of MyNetworkTV, for which News Corporation announced its formation on February 22 as a new joint network venture between its then-sibling subsidiaries Fox Television Stations and Twentieth Television (the former is now part of Fox Corporation, and the latter now operates as a unit of The Walt Disney Company by way of Disney's 2019 acquisition of 21st Century Fox) that was created to primarily a network programming option (in lieu of converting to a general entertainment independent format) for UPN and WB stations that were not chosen to affiliate with The CW. KOCB officially remained a WB affiliate until September 17, 2006; it affiliated with The CW when that network debuted the following day on September 18, at which time the station changed its on-air branding to "The CW Oklahoma City". (The station's branding changed again to "CW34" in August 2007.) KAUT, meanwhile, had joined MyNetworkTV upon that network's September 5 launch.

On August 25, 2007, a cable feeding KOCB's transmitter facility failed during a broadcast of a Dallas Cowboys-Houston Texans NFL preseason game, leaving the station off the air for the better part of two weeks. KOCB's analog and digital signals remained dark until 3:00 p.m. on August 29, only for the transmitter to fail again that night around 12:00 a.m. The station's direct fiber optic studio feed that was fed to headends operated by Cox Communications was only interrupted for a short time. KOCB's over-the-air signal returned to the air about two weeks later (on September 10) in time for the start of The CW's Fall 2007 prime time schedule. On March 5, 2012, KOCB and KOKH became the final two Oklahoma City television stations to begin carrying syndicated programs, station promos and commercials in high definition (rebroadcasts of KOKH's newscasts continued to be broadcast in 4:3 standard definition until August 2013, when that station upgraded its newscast production to HD).

On May 8, 2017, Sinclair entered into an agreement to acquire Tribune Media—which had owned NBC affiliate KFOR-TV and independent station KAUT-TV since December 2013—for $3.9 billion plus the assumption of $2.7 billion in Tribune-held debt. Because Sinclair and Tribune each owned two television stations in the Oklahoma City market, with KFOR and KOKH both ranking among the market's four highest-rated stations in total day viewership, the companies were required to sell either KOKH or KFOR (and optionally, KOCB and KAUT) to another station owner in order to comply with FCC local ownership rules. On April 24, 2018, in an amendment to the Tribune acquisition through which it proposed the sale of certain stations to both independent and affiliated third-party companies to curry the DOJ's approval, Sinclair announced that it would sell KOKH-TV and eight other stations—Sinclair-operated WRLH-TV in Richmond, KDSM-TV in Des Moines, WOLF-TV (along with LMA partners WSWB and WQMY) in Scranton/Wilkes-Barre and WXLV-TV in Greensboro–Winston-Salem–High Point, and Tribune-owned WPMT in Harrisburg and WXMI in Grand Rapids—to Standard Media Group (an independent broadcast holding company formed by private equity firm Standard General to assume ownership of and absolve ownership conflicts involving the aforementioned stations) for $441.1 million. Sinclair did not include KOCB in the sale, intending to place it in a new legal duopoly with KFOR-TV as well as form a virtual triopoly involving KFOR and KAUT, which—due to FCC rules that prohibited common ownership of more than two full-power stations in a single market—was to have been sold to affiliate company Howard Stirk Holdings for $750,000, pursuant to shared services and joint sales agreements to which Sinclair would have entered to assume operational responsibilities for KAUT-TV following the sale's completion. Under a transitional services agreement, Sinclair would have also continued to operate KOKH for six months after the sale's completion, before handing over operational responsibilities to Standard Media.

Less than one month after the FCC voted to have the deal reviewed by an administrative law judge amid "serious concerns" about Sinclair's forthrightness in its applications to sell certain conflict properties, on August 9, 2018, Tribune announced it would terminate the Sinclair deal, effectively terminating the Standard Media deal and keeping both KOKH and KOCB under Sinclair's purview. Tribune also filed a breach of contract lawsuit in the Delaware Chancery Court, alleging that Sinclair engaged in protracted negotiations with the FCC and the DOJ over regulatory issues, refused to sell stations in markets where it already had properties (such as KAUT-TV), and proposed divestitures to parties with ties to Sinclair executive chair David D. Smith that were rejected or highly subject to rejection to maintain control over stations it was required to sell. (Tribune—which retained ownership of KFOR and KAUT in the interim—would later sell most of its assets to the Nexstar Media Group.)

Subchannel history

KOCB-DT2
KOCB-DT2 is the TBD-affiliated second digital subchannel of KOCB, broadcasting in widescreen standard definition on channel 34.2. KOCB originally launched a digital subchannel on virtual channel 34.2 on April 1, 2006, to serve as an affiliate of The Tube Music Network, through a groupwide agreement encompassing many of Sinclair's network-affiliated and independent stations; however, Sinclair dropped the network from KOCB and its sister stations elsewhere in the U.S.—and decommissioned the 34.2 subchannel—in December 2006, due to disagreements between Sinclair and network parent The Tube Media Corp. over compliance of newly enacted FCC requirements for digital subchannels (the network ceased operations eleven months later, on October 1, 2007).

KOCB relaunched its DT2 subchannel on October 4, 2010, as an affiliate of TheCoolTV; it would later be pulled from the station on August 31, 2012, after Sinclair decided to drop the music video network from 32 of its then-approximately 70 stations nationwide. Following a two-year sabbatical, KOCB-DT2 was brought back on-air on July 1, 2014, now as an affiliate of the classic movie network GetTV, through a channel lease agreement that involved 33 of Sinclair's stations. On February 28, 2017, KOCB-DT2 disaffiliated from GetTV to become a charter affiliate of the Sinclair-owned digital content network TBD.

KOCB-DT3
KOCB-DT3 is the Comet-affiliated third digital subchannel of KOCB, broadcasting in widescreen standard definition on channel 34.3. On October 31, 2015, KOCB launched a digital subchannel on virtual channel 34.3, to serve as an affiliate of Comet, a science fiction-focused network owned by Sinclair in conjunction with Metro-Goldwyn-Mayer.

KOCB-DT4
KOCB-DT4 is the Dabl-affiliated fourth digital subchannel of KOCB, broadcasting in widescreen standard definition on channel 34.4.

On October 28, 2019, KOCB launched a digital subchannel on virtual channel 34.4, to serve as an affiliate of lifestyle-focused network Dabl. Because network parent CBS Media Ventures uses subchannel-leasing arrangements—a structure which, like with Ion Mystery on KAUT-DT3 and KSBI-DT4 locally, has often resulted in duplicative affiliates for a single network within the same market—as an affiliation clearance method for Dabl, KOCB-DT4 shares the Dabl affiliation with KFOR-DT4, which has carried the network since it launched on September 9, 2019. (From KOCB-DT4's launch until November 18, 2019, an error with reprogramming digital transmission codecs to add KOCB-DT4 caused the station's DT2 and DT3 feeds to mistakenly be flagged in the AFD #1001 aspect ratio descriptive, effectively causing both feeds to be horizontally compressed into an anamorphic 4:3 mode instead of TBD and Comet's native 16:9 format—by effect, causing archive and paid programs from both networks that were originally produced in the 4:3 format to be shown with horizontal pillarboxing.)

Programming

Sports programming
From 1992 to 2000, KOCB served as the broadcast home for the Oklahoma Sooners and Oklahoma State Cowboys under respective agreements with the University of Oklahoma's Sooner Sports Network and Oklahoma State University's Cowboys Sports Network syndication services; the station typically broadcast between five and eight Sooners, Cowboys and Cowgirls regular season basketball games each annually during the run of the contract, as well as various magazine and analysis programs involving the two universities' foot ball and basketball teams. From 1991 to 1994 and from 1995 to 1997, KOCB carried regular season Major League Baseball games featuring the Texas Rangers (produced by KTVT in Dallas–Fort Worth). In addition, in 1993, the station held the local syndication rights to broadcast MLB games involving the Kansas City Royals (distributed by KSMO-TV in Kansas City, which Sinclair owned alongside KOCB from 1996 to 2005).

From 1998 to 2014, the station also aired college basketball games from the Big 12 Conference that were syndicated by ESPN Plus; KOCB aired between ten and twelve regular season games each year as well as games from the first three rounds of the Big 12 men's basketball tournament, with most college basketball telecasts airing on Saturday afternoons with occasional weeknight prime time games. From 2001 to 2019, KOCB held the local broadcast rights to NFL preseason games from the Dallas Cowboys through the team's Silverstar Network syndication service. The station, which assumed the preseason telecast rights to the team from KFOR (which re-assumed rights to the team's preseason games, analysis programs and specials in 2020), carried roughly between three and five prime time game telecasts annually. (Prime time telecasts of Big 12 and Cowboys games resulted in WB/CW prime time shows being rescheduled to air on weekend afternoons or weekend evening slots that neither network programmed, often preempting movies normally scheduled between 7:00 and 9:00 p.m.)

In August 2014, KOCB became a charter outlet of the American Sports Network (ASN), a Sinclair-owned ad hoc syndication service that mainly carries college sports events (this effectively relegated local broadcasts of Big 12 basketball games, including those involving the Oklahoma Sooners and Oklahoma State Cowboys, to Fox Sports Oklahoma and select national cable sports networks such as ESPN). KOCB mainly carried college football and basketball games as well as auto races carried by the service on its main channel; prior to KOCB-DT2's conversion into a TBD affiliate, that subchannel served as an alternate feed of the service, carrying college basketball games not carried on the main channel 34.1 and college baseball games (most of these ancillary events are now carried by ASN successor Stadium, which is affiliated with the DT3 subchannel of sister station KOKH). In August 2021, KOCB debuted a local version of Sinclair's Friday Night Rivals high school football franchise, consisting of weekly telecasts of Oklahoma Secondary School Activities Association (OSSAA)-sanctioned regular season games (airing in place of The CW's Friday lineup, which is shown immediately following the telecasts).

Lottery
On November 10, 2005, KOCB and KOKH became the flagship stations for the Oklahoma Lottery, which held its televised Pick 3 and Cash 5 evening drawings at the duopoly's Wilshire Boulevard studios during the run of the duopoly's contract with the Oklahoma Lottery Commission. The drawings—which were simulcast on KOCB—aired nightly at 9:20 p.m. on both stations; channel 25 aired them on tape delay on nights when the prime time newscast was delayed due to Fox Sports event overruns. Reductions to the Oklahoma Lottery Commission's budget would result in the televised draws being replaced with drawings conducted via random number generator at the Oklahoma Lottery offices in July 2009. From when Oklahoma became a participant in the multi-state drawing in January 2006 until the stations stopped carrying all lottery results in 2013, KOKH/KOCB also aired live Powerball drawings each Wednesday and Saturday evening (live drawings for Mega Millions—of which Oklahoma became a participant in January 2011—were only available in the Oklahoma City market through WGN America, which discontinued national carriage of the live Powerball and Mega Millions drawings in 2013).

Newscasts and local programming
For the first 34 years of the station's existence, KOCB had never broadcast any local news programming; it was the only entertainment-based commercial television station in the Oklahoma City market to have never regularly air newscasts produced specifically for the station. (As an independent station, news programming on KOCB mainly came from syndicated series like the Independent Network News, which moved to KAUT in October 1982, and the opening news segment of The 700 Club, which KOCB aired from the station's October 1979 launch until September 1994.) On February 3, 1980, KOCB premiered OKC Forum, a weekly public affairs talk show—which aired on Sunday nights, with a rebroadcast the following Saturday morning—that focused on prominent people, issues and events in the Oklahoma City area; following a 4½-year run, the program was discontinued after the August 25, 1985, broadcast.

In June 2005, starting with that year's Major League Baseball All-Star Game, channel 34 began serving as an alternate carrier of sister station KOKH's 9:00 p.m. newscast, the Fox 25 Primetime News at Nine, during situations when Fox Sports event coverage—and, rarely, network prime time film presentations—overran into the timeslot on channel 25. The condensed half-hour editions of the newscast usually air on KOCB when KOKH televises the MLB All-Star Game, select postseason games (particularly during the World Series) and, occasionally, during prime time NFL preseason telecasts. (KOKH elects to air its late newscast following most Fox Sports telecasts shown on Saturday nights—including college football—and, as of September 2019, during the network's Thursday Night Football broadcasts.)

Eventually, on August 30, 2010, channel 34 began to air a rebroadcast of the Fox 25 Primetime News at Nine (renamed Fox 25 News at 9:00 in 2021) at midnight Monday through Friday nights. (Paid programming or episodes of The Andy Griffith Show occasionally fill the program's second half-hour when sporting events abbreviate the event-delayed edition of the newscast on KOKH to a half-hour broadcast.)

Technical information

Subchannels
The station's digital signal is multiplexed:

Analog-to-digital conversion
KOCB discontinued regular programming on its analog signal, over UHF channel 34, on February 17, 2009, as part of the federally mandated transition from analog to digital television (which Congress had moved the previous month to June 12). The station's digital signal remained on its pre-transition UHF channel 33, using PSIP to display KOCB's virtual channel as 34 on digital television receivers.

Translators
To reach viewers throughout the 34 counties comprising the Oklahoma City Designated Market Area, KOCB extends its over-the-air coverage area through a network of six low-power digital translator stations – all of which transmit using PSIP virtual channel 34 – encompassing much of Western Oklahoma that distribute its programming beyond the  range of its broadcast signal.

Notes

References

External links
 cwokc.com – KOCB official website
 okcfox.com – KOKH-TV official website

The CW affiliates
TBD (TV network) affiliates
Comet (TV network) affiliates
Dabl affiliates
Sinclair Broadcast Group
Television channels and stations established in 1979
OCB
1979 establishments in Oklahoma